A population centre, in Canadian census data, is a type of census unit which meets the demographic characteristics of an urban area, having a population of at least 1,000 people and a population density of no fewer than 400 persons per square km2. Note that the population of a "population centre" is not the same thing as the population of a municipality; the population centre can include areas outside the municipal boundaries which are directly contiguous with the municipality's urban area, and can exclude areas inside the municipal boundaries which are less densely urbanized.

The term was first introduced in the Canada 2011 Census; prior to that, Statistics Canada used the term urban area.

In the 2021 Census of Population, Statistics Canada listed 300 population centres in the province of Ontario.

List 
The below table is a list of those population centres in Ontario from the 2021 Census of Population as designated, named, and delineated by Statistics Canada.

See also 
List of the largest population centres in Canada
List of census agglomerations in Ontario
List of census subdivisions in Ontario
List of cities in Ontario
List of communities in Ontario
List of municipalities in Ontario
List of towns in Ontario
List of township municipalities in Ontario
List of villages in Ontario

References 

Population centre